Wayne Alvin Rutledge (January 5, 1942 – October 5, 2004) was a Canadian professional ice hockey goaltender who played in the National Hockey League (NHL) for the Los Angeles Kings and the World Hockey Association (WHA) for the Houston Aeros.

He died of stomach cancer in 2004.

References

External links
 

1942 births
2004 deaths
Barrie Colts players
Canadian ice hockey goaltenders
Clinton Comets players
Deaths from stomach cancer
Denver Spurs players
Houston Aeros (WHA) players
Los Angeles Kings players
Minnesota Rangers players
Niagara Falls Flyers players
Omaha Knights (CHL) players
Salt Lake Golden Eagles (WHL) players
Springfield Kings players
Windsor Bulldogs (1963–1964) players
Windsor Bulldogs (OHA) players
Ice hockey people from Ontario
Sportspeople from Barrie
Canadian expatriate ice hockey players in the United States
Deaths from cancer in Ontario